Nara Unateze is a town in the Nkanu East Local Government Area of Enugu State Nigeria

Town

The town contains eight communities, Ishiogbo, Umuawalagu, Amagu, Amofia, Umuiba, Umueze, Njiaguede, and Umuokparangene.

Boundaries

The town is bordered by Ugbawka, Nkerefi, Ihuokpara, Mburubu, and Isu Ohaozara.

Villages

The major villages are Amofia, Umuiba, Amagu, Umueze, umuaja,Umuokparangene,Umuawaragu

Features

Nara-unataeze has predominantly two major rivers which are, the Esu river and the Ojorowo River. The two rivers have their confluence at Obeagu Umueze.

Another great feature of this great town is the presence of its two major markets, namely Nkwo and Orie Nara whose market days are only four days apart from each other.

On each market day goods and commodities which Naraunateze is known for are always displayed in high quantities as it dubbed that the farm produce of garri and palm oil gotten in the town serves a quarter of the state's populace. 

A popular saying goes that the best way to a man's heart is through his stomach, the major delicacy of the Unataeze people is Ofe-awa (awa-soup) which is prepared with the awa leaf together with the egusi seeds preferably.

Nara-unateze as community is nicknamed "Obodo Iwe-ewe" which translates "a town who never gets angry".

The palace of HRH late Igwe Nathan Ogbu serves as a tourist attraction as the edifice boasts structural features unobtainable elsewhere.

Rulership

Nara-unataeze became popular under the reign of the late king HRH igwe Nathan Ogbu, Odenigbo 1 of Nara-unataeze, who was influential throughout his reign of over 40 decades. His good deeds was praised and sung by all, as it was highlighted in the various tracks of contemporary High life Musicians such Chief Osita Osadebe and Sir Oliver the Coque both of blessed memory.

After the influential King joined his ancestors, it took several years before the mantle of leadership was handed over to his son HRH Igwe Ifeanyi Ogbu, Odenigbo II of Nara unateze.

See also

Towns in Enugu State